The House of Lippe is the former reigning house of a number of small German states, two of which existed until the German Revolution of 1918–19, the Principality of Lippe and the Principality of Schaumburg-Lippe.

Princess Beatrix of the Netherlands, former Queen of the Netherlands (1980–2013), is an agnatic member of this house.

History 
The House of Lippe descends from Jodocus Herman, Lord of Lippe (died c. 1096), whose descendant Bernhard I was the founder of the state of Lippe in 1123.
Born ca 1090. The family has produced several of the longest-reigning monarchs in Europe, including the longest reigning (for 82 years), Bernard VII, Lord of Lippe (d. 1511). In 1528, Simon V was elevated to the rank of a ruling count of the Holy Roman Empire.

In 1613, the House's territory was split into the counties of Lippe-Detmold, Lippe-Brake and Lippe-Alverdissen. In 1643, Count Philipp of Lippe-Alverdissen inherited half of the neighboring County of Schaumburg and founded the Schaumburg-Lippe line of the House of Lippe. The Brake branch extinguished in 1709, disputedly inherited by the main, Lippe-Detmold line. Alverdissen was bought back from Schaumburg-Lippe by Lippe-Detmold in 1812. In the 18th century, the cadet line of Lippe-Biesterfeld split from the Detmold branch, and shortly thereafter Lippe-Weissenfeld split from Lippe-Biesterfeld as a further cadet branch. Both, Biesterfeld and Weissenfeld were so-called paragiums (non-sovereign estates of a cadet-branch) within the County of Lippe. Both branches, owning only modest manor houses in the county, acquired other (non-sovereign) property by marriage and moved out of the county in the late 18th century, the Biesterfeld branch to the Rhineland, and the Weissenfeld branch to Saxony.

The counts of Lippe-Detmold were granted the title of Imperial prince in 1789, while the counts of Schaumburg-Lippe became in fact princes by entering the Confederation of the Rhine in 1807 and legally by becoming a member state of the German Confederation in 1815.

The Principality of Lippe existed until the end of the German monarchies in 1918. In 1905, with the death of Alexander, Prince of Lippe, the senior Lippe-Detmold branch of the family became extinct and Count Leopold of Lippe-Biesterfeld (head of the non-ruling junior branch line Lippe-Biesterfeld) succeeded him as Prince, after an Imperial court ruling, in fact against the wishes of Wilhelm II, German Emperor, who would have preferred his brother-in-law Prince Adolf of Schaumburg-Lippe to succeed. Leopold IV continued to rule until the German Revolution of 1918. During the revolution, the ruling Princes of Lippe and Schaumburg-Lippe were forced to abdicate, ending the family's 795-year rule. In 1928, Prince Leopold's three sons by his first wife signed up to the Nazi Party. The eldest, Prince Ernst, was reputedly the first German prince to do so.

In 1937, Prince Bernhard of Lippe-Biesterfeld married Princess Juliana of the Netherlands. On the accession of their daughter Beatrix in 1980, the Netherlands Royal House officially remained known as the House of Orange-Nassau, although Beatrix and her sisters are agnatically members of the House of Lippe.

Stephan, Prince of Lippe (b. 1959) is the present senior of the House of Lippe. He still owns the estate and castle at Detmold, the former main residence of the principality. Alexander, Prince of Schaumburg-Lippe, head of the younger formerly sovereign branch, still resides at Bückeburg Palace.

States ruled by the House of Lippe
Lippe (1123–1918), known as Lippe-Detmold from 1621
Lippe-Brake (1621–1709)
Schaumburg-Lippe (1643–1918)

Non-ruling cadet branches
Lippe-Alverdissen (1613–1640 and 1681–1777)
Lippe-Biesterfeld 
Lippe-Weissenfeld

Rulers of Lippe

Partitions of Lippe under Lippe rule

Table of rulers

See also
List of consorts of Lippe

Castles of the House of Lippe

References

External links 

Regnal chronology of Lippe

|-

|-

 
1123 establishments in Europe
Dutch monarchy
German noble families
German royalty